Ipomopsis tenuituba is a species of flowering plant in the phlox family known by the common name slendertube skyrocket, or slendertube ipomopsis. It is native to much of the western United States from California to Colorado, where it is found on rocky mountain slopes. This is a perennial herb producing an erect stem with widely spaced leaves, each 3 to 6 centimeters long and with many narrow, fingerlike lobes. The inflorescences toward the top of the stem each hold three to seven flowers. The flower is very pale to medium pink, sometimes with white streaks, or solid white. It is a tube 2 to 5 centimeters long, opening into a corolla of five twisting, pointed, ribbonlike lobes. The stamens and style do not protrude far from the mouth of the flower, if at all. While it is a perennial plant, it dies after its first flowering.

External links
Jepson Manual Treatment
Photo gallery

tenuituba
Flora of the Western United States
Flora without expected TNC conservation status